Monika Kovač (born 21 March 1974) is a former Croatian female basketball player.

External links
Profile at eurobasket.com

1974 births
Living people
Basketball players from Berlin
Croatian women's basketball players
Point guards
Mediterranean Games gold medalists for Croatia
Mediterranean Games medalists in basketball
Competitors at the 1997 Mediterranean Games
20th-century Croatian women